Burkina Faso competed at the 2019 African Games held from 19 to 31 August 2019 in Rabat, Morocco. In total, athletes representing Burkina Faso won four gold medals, two silver medals and two bronze medals and the country finished in 14th place in the medal table.

Medal summary

Medal table 

|  style="text-align:left; width:78%; vertical-align:top;"|

|  style="text-align:left; width:22%; vertical-align:top;"|

Athletics 

In total, 18 athletes represented Burkina Faso in athletics and three gold medals and two silver medals were won.

Hugues Fabrice Zango won the gold medal in the men's triple jump event.

Lætitia Bambara won the gold medal in the women's hammer throw event.

Marthe Koala won the gold medal in the women's heptathlon event and the silver medal in the women's 100 metres hurdles event.

Bienvenu Sawadogo won the silver medal in the men's 400 metres hurdles event.

Football 

Burkina Faso's national under-20 football team competed at the 2019 African Games. They won the gold medal in the men's tournament and Djibril Ouattara was among the top scorers in the tournament.

Handball 

Burkina Faso competed in handball in the men's tournament. The team finished in 9th place.

Judo 

Seven athletes were registered to represent Burkina Faso in judo but only five competed in their events.

Karate 

Burkina Faso competed in karate.

Gloria Rachel Noela Guissou won the bronze medal in the women's +68 kg event.

Swimming 

Ouedraogo Adama, Angelika Sita Ouedraogo and Tindwende Thierry Sawadogo competed in swimming.

Taekwondo 

Teedanogo Pouniir Sawadogo, Wendaabo Levis Tresor Kabore, Passamwinde Faysal Sawadogo, Ali Yazbeck Coulibali and Aboubacar Drabo competed in Taekwondo.

Passamwinde Faysal Sawadogo won a bronze medal in the men's –80 kg event.

Wrestling 

Four athletes represented Burkina Faso in wrestling.

Men's freestyle

Women's freestyle

References 

Nations at the 2019 African Games
2019
African Games